San Fernando Municipality may refer to:

Colombia
San Fernando, Bolívar

El Salvador
San Fernando, Chalatenango
San Fernando, Morazán

Honduras
San Fernando, Ocotepeque

Mexico
San Fernando Municipality, Tamaulipas

Nicaragua
San Fernando, Nueva Segovia

Philippines
 San Fernando, Cebu
 San Fernando, Masbate

Venezuela
 San Fernando Municipality, Apure

Municipality name disambiguation pages